The flag of the Commonwealth of Independent States was adopted in 1996 and depicts a  yellow sun on a dark blue field, with eight bending poles holding the sun. The design symbolizes the desire for equal partnership, unity, peace and stability.

Former flag
Before the flag was adopted, a provisional flag just showing the letters "C.I.S." on a white background was used, e.g. at sporting events where a Commonwealth team replaced the Soviet Union when the Soviet Union had qualified for but never came to before it was dissolved.

See also
Emblem of the Commonwealth of Independent States
Flag of the Soviet Union

Notes

References

Commonwealth of Independent States
Commonwealth Of Independent States
Flags introduced in 1996